"In the Morning" is a song by American musician Jack Johnson from This Warm December: A Brushfire Holiday Vol. 2. The song was released on November 1, 2011 and features Paula Fuga, and John Cruz.

Composition 
When writing the song, Johnson wanted to capture the excitement of Christmas morning such as “laughing in their sleep / And swimming through dreams into the morning.” In the song, it also references Ebeneezer Scrooge when Johnson says "No!Bah! Humbug!”

Release 
The song was released as a CD and digital single on November 1, 2011, which was fifteen days before the album release on November 15. 25% of all the proceeds were donated to charities such as Little Kids Rock and Silverlake Conservatory which all support kids. On November 27, 2017, a version of the song was released on Spotify called "In The Morning 2017."

Music video 
A music video for the song was released on Surfline's YouTube channel on December 11, 2011. The music video features Jack, Paula Fuga, and John Cruz performing the song acoustically on the North Shore of Oahu Island. The video has currently spawned over 2.3 million views on Youtube.

Charts

References 

2011 songs
Jack Johnson (musician) songs
Songs written by Jack Johnson (musician)